Destroyed is the first full-length studio album by punk band Sloppy Seconds. It was released by Toxic Shock Records, on LP and cassette, and co-released on CD by the Musical Tragedies label in Germany, both in 1989.

The album was reissued on Metal Blade (CD and cassette) in the UK and US and Metal Mind in Poland (cassette) in 1994, Last Resort Records (picture disc LP) in 1995, Coldfront Records (CD) on October 15, 2002, Kid Tested Records (CD, double LP) in 2009 to commemorate the album's 20th anniversary, and D-Tour (LP) in 2018. The album cover is a parody of the Kiss album Destroyer, from 1976.

Track listing
All songs written by Sloppy Seconds unless indicated.

Toxic Shock, Last Resort and D-Tour releases

Toxic Shock/Musical Tragedies CD

The LP editions of this re-release include the above tracks on an extra, single-sided LP (with an etching on the other side), but do not include "Leavin' on a Jet Plane."

Personnel
 B.A. – yells, producer
 Steve Sloppy – drums, producer
 Bo'Ba Jam – bass, producer
 Dr. Roadkill – guitar, producer
 Paul Mahern – producer, engineer
 Mike Kreffel – artwork, cover art, pre-press layout
 Rob Perkins – background vocals, photography, road crew
 Paul Bohall – background vocals, road crew, bus repair technician
 Craig "R.V." Croomes – background vocals
 Jeff Masengale – background vocals, photography
 Scott Turns – background vocals, road crew
 John Barron – road crew

Trivia
"Leavin' On A Jet Plane" is taken from the "Come Back Traci" single (1989).
"Serious" is taken from the compilation Welcome To Our Nightmare: A Tribute To Alice Cooper (1993).
"Human Waste" is taken from the "I Don't Wanna Be A Homosexual" single (1990).
"Conned Again" and "Hooray for Santa Claus" are taken from the Lonely Christmas EP (1992).
"Don's Guns" is taken from The Shot Heard Around The World compilation (1986).
"Before Cable" (renamed "Before We Had Cable") is taken from War Between The States: North compilation (1989).
On the cover, Steve Sloppy is wearing a Misfits shirt.
The song "I Don't Wanna Be a Homosexual" was the inspiration for the tongue-in-cheek song "I Wanna Be a Homosexual" by Screeching Weasel.

References

1990 albums
Sloppy Seconds albums
Toxic Shock Records albums